Russia took part at the 2020 Winter Youth Olympics in Lausanne, Switzerland from 9 to 22 January 2020. A total of 104 athletes competed in 16 sports. Russian athletes won a record of 10 gold, 11 silver and 8 bronze medals, topping host Switzerland in the overall ranking.

Medalists
Medals awarded to participants of mixed-NOC teams are represented in italics. These medals are not counted towards the individual NOC medal tally.

|width="25%" align=left valign=top|

Competitors
The following is the list of number of competitors that could participate at the Games per sport/discipline.

Alpine skiing

Boys

Girls

Mixed

Biathlon

Boys

Girls

Mixed

Bobsleigh

Cross-country skiing

Boys

Girls

Curling

Russia qualified a mixed team of four athletes.

Mixed team

Mixed doubles

Figure skating

12 Russian figure skaters achieved quota places for Russia based on the results of the 2019 World Junior Figure Skating Championships.

Singles

Couples

Mixed NOC team trophy

Freestyle skiing

Big air / Halfpipe / Slopestyle

Ski cross

Ice hockey

Boys' tournament
Roster

Summary

Preliminary round

Semifinal

Final

Boys' 3x3 mixed tournament

Girls' 3x3 mixed tournament

Luge

Boys

Girls

Mixed team relay

Nordic combined

Individual

Nordic mixed team

Short track speed skating

Three Russian skaters achieved quota places for Russia based on the results of the 2019 World Junior Short Track Speed Skating Championships.

Boys

Girls

Mixed team relay

Skeleton

Ski jumping

Individual

Team

Ski mountaineering

Individual

Sprint

Mixed team relay

Snowboarding

Big air / Halfpipe / Slopestyle

Snowboard cross

Snowboard and ski cross relay

Speed skating

Three Russian skaters achieved quota places for Russia based on the results of the 2019 World Junior Speed Skating Championships.

Boys

Girls

Mixed team sprint

See also
Russian Olympic Committee athletes at the 2020 Summer Olympics

References

2020 in Russian sport
Nations at the 2020 Winter Youth Olympics
Russia at the Youth Olympics